Vornic was a historical rank for an official in charge of justice and internal affairs. He was overseeing the Royal Court. It originated in the Slovak nádvorník. In the 16th century in Moldavia were two high vornics: one for "Ţara de Sus" (the "Upper Land"), and other for "Ţara de Jos" (the "Lower Land").

Romanian noble titles
Romanian words and phrases